Sandboxing may refer to:

 Sandbox (computer security), a mechanism for safely running untrusted programs
 Sandbox (software development), a testing environment isolated from the production environment

See also 

 Sandbox (disambiguation)